Fábio Alexandre Jesus Santos (born 25 July 1998) is a Portuguese professional footballer who plays for C.D. Fátima as a defender

Club career
He made his LigaPro debut for Farense on 3 March 2019 in a game against Cova da Piedade.

References

External links

1998 births
Living people
People from Faro, Portugal
Association football defenders
Liga Portugal 2 players
Segunda Divisão players
Campeonato de Portugal (league) players
S.C. Farense players
C.D. Fátima players
Portuguese footballers
Sportspeople from Faro District